Ana Thea Cenarosa (born February 26, 1992) is a Filipino netballer who plays as a goal attacker for the Philippines national netball team. She was part of the Philippines team in both the 2015 and 2017 Southeast Asian Games, captaining the team in the latter.

She was also a basketball player who played for her collegiate team the NU Lady Bulldogs at the UAAP.

Cenarosa has also competed in beauty pageants and is noted for finishing as a runner up in the Miss Philippines Earth 2019. She was also a candidate in the Binibining Pilipinas 2020 pageant.

References

1992 births
Living people
Filipino women's basketball players
Filipino netball players
NU Lady Bulldogs basketball players
Competitors at the 2015 Southeast Asian Games
Competitors at the 2017 Southeast Asian Games
Competitors at the 2019 Southeast Asian Games
Miss Philippines Earth contestants
Southeast Asian Games competitors for the Philippines